Dmitry Tursunov and Andrey Rublev were the defending champions, but Tursunov chose not to participate this year. Rublev played alongside Daniil Medvedev, but lost in the semifinals to Julian Knowle and Jürgen Melzer.

Juan Sebastián Cabal and Robert Farah won the title, defeating Knowle and Melzer in the final, 7–5, 4–6, [10–5].

Seeds

Draw

Draw

References
 Main Draw

2016 Doubles
Kremlin Cup - Doubles
Kremlin Cup - Doubles